Soggy biscuit (also known as ookie cookie, limp biscuit, wet biscuit, shoot the cookie, jizzcuit, or cum on a cookie) is a male group masturbation activity in which the participants stand around a biscuit (UK) or cookie (US) masturbating and ejaculating onto it; the last person to do so must eat the biscuit. Additionally, a participant who fails to hit the biscuit when he ejaculates must then eat it. The game is reportedly played by adolescents, notably in the United Kingdom, the United States, and Australia. In Australia, it is also known as soggy SAO after the SAO brand of biscuits that are popular there.

Soggy biscuit is associated with homosexuality, even though the game does not require sexual contact; the idea and practice of the game is in keeping with the spirit of adolescent sexual exploration associated by many in the UK with public schools or in Australia with private schools. 
 
According to the book Law of the Playground, 1,866 men were asked: "How close have you got to the game of soggy biscuit, in which you race to wank onto a cracker?" Of the respondents, 6.2% reportedly admitted to having played the game.

In November 2011, The Eagle-Tribune reported that police were investigating claims that two Andover High School (Massachusetts) basketball players were hazed by older team members into playing the game. In January 2012, it was reported that two students had been expelled over the incident and a further five were suspended. A grand jury was convened to determine if any of the students should be charged criminally.

See also
 Bukkake
 Cake of Light
 Circle jerk
 Hazing
 Not Gay
 Semen ingestion

References

External links

Masturbation
Sexual slang
Male masturbation